Pararctophila is a genus of Hoverflies, from the family Syrphidae, in the order Diptera.

Species
P. brunnescens Huo & Shi, 2007
P. oberthueri Hervé-Bazin, 1914

References

Diptera of Asia
Hoverfly genera
Eristalinae